Ludwig Kuhn (26 May 1918 – 6 May 2001) was a German ice hockey player. He competed in the men's tournament at the 1952 Winter Olympics.

References

External links
 

1918 births
2001 deaths
Olympic ice hockey players of Germany
Ice hockey players at the 1952 Winter Olympics
Sportspeople from Füssen